The Tuke family of York were a family of Quaker innovators involved in establishing:
Rowntree's Cocoa Works
The Retreat Mental Hospital
three Quaker schools - Ackworth, Bootham, and The Mount

They included four generations. The main Tukes were:
William Tuke III (1732-1822), founder of The Retreat at York, one of the first modern insane asylums, in 1792
Henry Tuke (1755-1814)
Samuel Tuke (1784-1857)
James Hack Tuke (1819-1896)

Others included:
William Murray Tuke (1822-1903), who gained his second name from Lindley Murray
Dame Margaret Jansen Tuke, D.B.E., M.A. (1862-1947) Principal of Bedford College, London University
Henry Scott Tuke (12 June 1858 – 13 March 1929), British painter and photographer, is best remembered for his paintings of naked boys and young men, which have earned him a status as a pioneer of gay male culture
Daniel Hack Tuke (1827–1895), was a prominent campaigner for humane treatment of the insane

See also
"John Tuke, of the city of York, linen-draper, dealer, and chapman" announced on list of "B_K_TS"  
Tuke pedigree

Sources
Willam K Sessions and E.Margaret Sessions (1971) The Tukes of York in the Seventeenth, Eighteenth and Nineteenth Centuries Ebor Press, York. (Includes family tree of 12 generations, pp. 116–117.)

External links
History of York: Tuke family and Rowntree's

English families
Tuke family of York
Quaker families